Paul Balog may refer to:

 Paul Balog, Bishop of Veszprém (died 1275), Hungarian prelate
 Paul Balog, Bishop of Pécs (died 1306), bishop in the Kingdom of Hungary 
 Paul Balog (numismatist) (1900–1982), Hungarian-born Italian numismatist